Idol Street (stylized as iDOL Street) is a Japanese record label and music project specializing in idols.

It was launched by Avex on October 2, 2010 as a dedicated idol record label. The first artist on the new label was the idol group Super Girls, formed in June 2010. As of March 2015, four girl groups have debuted on the label: Super Girls, Cheeky Parade (Until Summer 2018), GEM (Until Spring 2018) and The World Standard.

Idol Street Project 
The project includes 13 members: 9 members of Super Girls and 4 members of The World Standard.

Members

Super Girls

The World Standard

Former Members

Cheeky Parade

GEM

Street-sei 
Yokono Sumire (now a member of NMB48)

Solo 
  — graduated from Super Girls on February 23, 2014

References

External links 
 
 
 Idol Street on Ustream
 Avex Audition (audition information website)
 Idol Street on Niconico

Japanese record labels
Japanese idol groups
Record labels established in 2010
Avex Group talents
Record labels owned by Avex Group
Japanese companies established in 2010